Anne-Marie Johnson (born July 18, 1960) is an American actress and impressionist. She is perhaps best known for her roles as Nadine Hudson–Thomas in What's Happening Now!! (1985–1988), and Althea Tibbs in In the Heat of the Night (1988–1993). Johnson is known as a cast member of the FOX sketch comedy television series In Living Color (1993–1994) during its final season, and has had recurring or regular roles in Melrose Place, JAG, Girlfriends and The InBetween.

Biography

Early life and education
Anne-Marie Johnson was born in Los Angeles, California. For high school, she attended John Marshall High School, graduating in 1978. Johnson graduated from University of California, Los Angeles (UCLA) with a degree in Acting and Theater.

Career
Johnson's first US television appearance was as a contestant on the game show Card Sharks that originally aired on June 5, 1979, where her name was listed as Anne Johnson. She appeared on the game show Child's Play under her full name as well as a pilot episode for the game show Body Language as Anne Marie Johnson, where she described herself as a "struggling actress". Johnson began her career appearing in episodes of the Australian dramas Homicide and Matlock Police in the 1970s. In 1984, she played the role of Aileen Lewis on the short-lived NBC comedy series Double Trouble, and at the same time had a recurring role on the NBC police drama Hill Street Blues. 

She played Raj's wife Nadine Hudson Thomas in the syndicated sitcom What's Happening Now!! from 1985 to 1988. In 1988, Johnson began starring as Althea Tibbs in the NBC/CBS police drama series In the Heat of the Night, playing the role through 1993. While appearing on In the Heat of the Night, Johnson recorded the song "Little Drummer Boy" for the 1991 cast Christmas CD Christmas Time's A Comin. Providing vocals behind her were country gospel group The Marksmen Quartet. The song was produced by co-stars Randall Franks and Alan Autry. She also appeared in a number of movies including Robot Jox (1989), which featured her only career nude scene, The Five Heartbeats (1991), True Identity (1991), and Strictly Business (1991). On television, she played a leading role in the 1989 film Dream Date and starred as Carrie Jones/Carolyn Dimes in the 1990 miniseries Lucky Chances.
 
After leaving In the Heat of the Night, Johnson joined the cast of the Fox sketch comedy series In Living Color in its last season (1993–1994). She portrayed Alycia Barnett in the Fox prime-time soap opera Melrose Place from 1995 to 1996. From 1997 to 2002, she had a recurring role on the CBS series JAG as Representative Bobbi Latham. She also has made guest appearances on other TV series, including That's So Raven Living Single; Murder, She Wrote; Leverage; Ally McBeal; Girlfriends; The Parkers; Dharma & Greg; CSI: Crime Scene Investigation; NCIS; Tyler Perry's House of Payne and Grey's Anatomy. 

In 2019, she had a regular role in the short-lived NBC drama The InBetween and in 2020 had a recurring roles in the Oprah Winfrey Network drama Cherish the Day and ABC legal thriller How to Get Away with Murder.

Other activities
Johnson was elected first national vice president of the Screen Actors Guild in 2008. She ran for president of the actors' union in 2009 on the Membership First ticket, but she lost to eventual winner Ken Howard.

Personal life
Johnson has been married once and has no children. Since January 1, 1996, she has been married to Martin Grey.

Filmography

Film

Television

References

External links

1960 births
20th-century American actresses
21st-century American actresses
Actresses from Los Angeles
African-American actresses
American film actresses
American television actresses
American voice actresses
Contestants on American game shows
Living people
UCLA Film School alumni
20th-century African-American women
20th-century African-American people
21st-century African-American women
21st-century African-American people